The 2020 Super Rugby AU season (branded as Vodafone Super Rugby AU for sponsorship reasons) was a professional club rugby union tournament organised by Rugby Australia. Sponsored by communications company Vodafone, the tournament replaced the Australian component of the incomplete 2020 Super Rugby season that was shut down in March of that year due to the COVID-19 pandemic. It featured the four teams from the 2020 Australian conference, with the addition of former Super Rugby franchise the Western Force.

The tournament was the inaugural season of Super Rugby AU and ran from 3 July to 19 September 2020.

Law adaptions 
On 12 June, Rugby Australia announced seven law trials designed to make the game more entertaining for the fans and players. The trials were adapted from the 10 optional law trials available for unions and competitions given by World Rugby in May 2020. The following trials will be used during the competition:

Standings

Matches

Round 1

Round 2

Round 3

Round 4

Round 5

Round 6

Round 7

Round 8

Round 9

Round 10 – Super Saturday

Qualifying final

Final

Squads

Notes
  Due to a spike in COVID-19 cases in Victoria, the Rebels moved this home fixture from AAMI Park to Brookvale Oval, New South Wales, in order to respect the regulations imposed by the Queensland Government.
  Due to tight border restrictions, the Western Force moved their rounds 4 & 5 home matches from HBF Park to Leichhardt Oval, New South Wales.
  Due to a spike in COVID-19 cases in Victoria, the Rebels moved their rounds 6 & 9 home fixtures from AAMI Park to Leichhardt Oval, New South Wales.
  Due to tight border restrictions, the Western Force moved their rounds 7 & 8 home matches from HBF Park to Cbus Super Stadium, Gold Coast, Queensland.
  Due to a spike in COVID-19 cases in Victoria, the Rebels moved their round 10 home fixture from AAMI Park to McDonald Jones Stadium, New South Wales.
 Total attendance and average attendance figures include a match without spectators due to the COVID-19 pandemic restrictions and a round 2 match in which an attendance figure was not reported.

References

External links
 

2020 Super Rugby season
2020 in Australian rugby union
2020 rugby union tournaments for clubs